Marek Zachar (born June 11, 1998) is a Czech professional ice hockey player. He is currently playing for Sherbrooke Phoenix of the Quebec Major Junior Hockey League (QMJHL) after two seasons with Bílí Tygři Liberec.

Zachar made his Czech Extraliga debut playing with Bílí Tygři Liberec during the 2015-16 Czech Extraliga season. He was drafted by Sherbrooke in the second round (72nd overall) of the 2016 CHL Import Draft.

References

External links

1998 births
Living people
HC Bílí Tygři Liberec players
Czech ice hockey forwards
Sportspeople from Liberec
Sherbrooke Phoenix players
Czech expatriate ice hockey players in Canada